The Taming of the Shrew is a 1973 Australian TV screening of the Old Tote production of the play by William Shakespeare, relocated to an unnamed town in New South Wales at the turn of the twentieth century.

References

External links

Production details of 1972 Old Tote performance at AusStage

Australian television films
1973 television films
1973 films
Films based on The Taming of the Shrew
1970s English-language films